Same-sex marriage has been legal in Morelos since 5 July 2016. A bill to amend the State Constitution to legalize same-sex marriage in Morelos passed Congress on 18 May 2016 by 20 votes to 6. Ratification by a majority of the state's 33 municipalities was confirmed on 27 June 2016. The law was published in the official state gazette on 4 July 2016 and took effect the following day.

Legal history

Background
Bills to legalize same-sex marriage and adoption by same-sex couples in Morelos were first proposed by the Labor Party (PT) in January 2010. The proposal was opposed by the conservative National Action Party (PAN), and rejected in February 2010. A subsequent proposal was also rejected in March 2013. The Party of the Democratic Revolution (PRD) announced in July 2014 that a vote on a measure to legalize same-sex marriage would occur in September 2014. On 19 September 2014, civil society organizations including the Marcha de la Diversidad Sexual en Morelos launched impeachment procedures against members of the Committee on Constitutional Issues for failure to follow article 54 of the Internal Regulations of Congress. The impeachment proceeding indicated that the same-sex marriage bill had been in committee for 20 months, but the committee is legally required to submit their recommendations on bills to Congress within 60 days.

On 28 August 2013, a same-sex couple, José Ricardo Almanza Luna and Heriberto Álvarez López, filed an amparo in court seeking the right to marry. The amparo was granted by a judge of the Second District Court in January 2014, who ordered the civil registry office in Xochitepec to process the marriage application. The couple married on 17 May 2014. In January 2014, another same-sex couple began the process and in July were granted an amparo to marry. An appeal was filed, but after losing the appeal, the registrar performed the marriage ceremony in the town of Ciudad Ayala on 6 September 2014. Marquez Edgar Ortega, director of Atención a la Diversidad Sexual, announced at the wedding that six more amparos for same-sex marriage rights had been requested in Morelos. On 29 October 2014, a lesbian couple from Cuernavaca were granted the right to divorce, after a court recognized their marriage.

The Mexican Supreme Court ruled on 12 June 2015 that state bans on same-sex marriage are unconstitutional nationwide under Articles 1 and 4 of the Constitution of Mexico. The court's ruling is considered a "jurisprudential thesis" and did not invalidate state laws, meaning that same-sex couples denied the right to wed would still have to seek individual amparos in court. The ruling standardized the procedures for judges and courts throughout Mexico to approve all applications for same-sex marriages and made the approval mandatory.

Constitutional reform

On 27 July 2015, Governor Graco Ramírez introduced legislation to Congress to legalize same-sex marriages. Governor Ramírez's proposal was to reform article 120 of the Constitution of Morelos and articles 22, 65 and 68 of the Family Code to bring them into line with the jurisprudence set forth by the Mexican Supreme Court on 12 June 2015, when it ruled that bans on same-sex marriage are unconstitutional nationwide. 

On 18 May 2016, the Congress of Morelos voted 20 to 6 to approve the constitutional change to legalize same-sex marriage. Governor Ramírez welcomed the approval of the bill. Ratification by at least 17 of the state's 33 municipalities was required for the constitutional amendment to take effect. The municipalities had until 25 June 2016 to act on the constitutional change. If they did not act by that date, they were regarded as having consented to the amendment (so-called "constructive assent", afirmativa ficta). At the end of the process, a total of 17 municipalities had ratified the constitutional change and 15 had voted against ratification, while 1 municipality was awarded an extra week, although the clear majority being in favor meant that same-sex marriage would become legal in the state. The municipalities which voted in favor of the reform were Cuautla, Emiliano Zapata, Huitzilac, Jantetelco, Jiutepec, Puente de Ixtla, Temixco, Tetecala, Tlaquiltenango, Totolapan, Yautepec de Zaragoza and Yecapixtla. Additionally, the municipalities of Axochiapan, Cuernavaca, Mazatepec, Tepalcingo and Tlayacapan did not vote and as such were regarded as having assented to the amendment. The remaining municipalities voted against the change. The law was promulgated and published in the state's official gazette on 4 July 2016. It took effect on 5 July. The state adoption agency clarified that the law allows same-sex couples to adopt jointly; the adoption process is open to all spouses in Morelos.

On 29 August 2016, 17 municipalities filed a constitutional challenge with the Mexican Supreme Court to reverse the same-sex marriage reform. They argued that the Congress of Morelos had "acted illegally" when it validated the reform. Officials in two municipalities (Mazatepec and Tepalcingo) said that their vote was regarded as a "constructive assent", even though they had reportedly voted against. The Supreme Court dismissed the challenge on 8 September 2016.

Article 120 of the Constitution of Morelos now reads:
 in Spanish: 
(Marriage is the voluntary union of two people, with equal rights and obligations, with the purpose of building a community of life and offering mutual aid.)

Marriage statistics
The following table shows the number of same-sex marriages performed in Morelos since legalization in 2016 as reported by the National Institute of Statistics and Geography.

Public opinion
A 2017 opinion poll conducted by  found that 51% of Morelos residents supported same-sex marriage, while 45% were opposed.

According to a 2018 survey by the National Institute of Statistics and Geography, 38.5% of the Morelos public opposed same-sex marriage.

See also
 Same-sex marriage in Mexico
 LGBT rights in Mexico

Notes

References

Morelos
Morelos
2016 in LGBT history